Morningside railway station may refer to:

 Morningside railway station, Queensland, on the Cleveland line in Brisbane, Australia
 Morningside railway station, Auckland, on the Western Line of the Auckland railway network in New Zealand
 Morningside Road railway station, a disused station in Edinburgh, Scotland
 Morningside railway station (Lanarkshire), a disused station in North Lanarkshire, Scotland
 Morningside railway station, Caledonian, a disused station on the Wishaw and Coltness Railway